, born  was a Japanese actor. For his work in Cure, Hana-bi and other films, Osugi was given the Best Supporting Actor award at the 1999 Yokohama Film Festival. He often worked alongside Takeshi Kitano and Susumu Terajima. In the DVD commentary to the MPD Psycho television series, director Takashi Miike said that he admired Osugi's experience to shift quickly from comic and imbecilic to authoritative and earnest. He died of heart failure at the age of 66 on February 21, 2018.

Filmography

Films

1980s
 Kinbaku ikenie (緊縛いけにえ)　(1980)
 Empire of Kids (ガキ帝国; Gaki teikoku) (1981)
 Beautiful Mystery (巨根伝説　美しき謎; Kyokon densetsu: utsukushii nazo) (1983)
 Abnormal Family: Older Brother's Bride a.k.a. Spring Bride (変態家族兄貴の嫁さん; Hentai kazoku: Aniki no yomesan) (1984)
 Momoiro shintai kensa (桃色身体検査) (1985)

1990
Love of Sawako (さわこの恋　上手な嘘の恋愛講座)

1991
 Door II: Tokyo Diary
 Nowhere Man (無能の人; Muno no hito)
 Hello Porcupine (ハロー張りネズミ; Haro harinezumi)

1992
The River with No Bridge (橋のない川; Hashi no nai kawa)
The Guard from Underground

1993
 Sonatine (ソナチネ)
 Bodyguard Kiba (ボディガード牙; Bodigaado Kiba)
 The Wicked Reporter (極道記者; Gokudou kisha)
 We're No Angels (俺達は天使じゃない; Oretachi wa tenshi ja nai)

1994
Ninja Sentai Kakuranger (忍者戦隊カクレンジャー) - Sarugami

1995
 Black Money (ブラックマネー; Burakkmanei)
Getting Any? (みんな～やってるか！; Minna-yatteruka!)
 ルビー The Target
Marks (マークスの山; Maakusu no yama)
A Weather Girl (お天気お姉さん; Otenki Oneesan)
Voyeurs, Inc. (のぞき屋; Nozokiya)
 Shinjuku Triad Society (新宿黒社会　チャイナ　マフィア戦争)
Maborosi (幻の光)

1996
XX: Beautiful Prey (ＸＸ　美しき獲物; XX: utsukushiki emono
Shall We Dance? (Shall We ダンス？)
 Ghost Actress (女優霊; Joyuu rei) a.k.a. Don't Look Up
Boys Are Ambitious (岸和田少年愚連隊)
Door III
Scandal (スキャンドール)
Kids Return
A Weatherwoman お天気お姉さん
Non-Stop (弾丸ランナー; Dangan ran'naa)

1997
The Revenge: A Scar That Never Disappears (復讐　THE REVENGE　消えない傷痕; Fukushu the Revenge Kienai Shokon)
Postman Blues (ポストマン・ブルース)
GANSTER II: 東京魔悲夜　外伝
D#1
Full Metal Yakuza (極道; Full Metal Gokudou)
Cure (キュア)

1998
Hana-bi
Dolphin Through
Love Letter (ラブ・レター )
The Black Angel (黒の天使; Kuro no tenshi Vol. 1)
The Goofball (愚か者　傷だらけの天使; Orokamono: Kizu darake no Tenshi)
Unlucky Monkey (アンラッキー・モンキー; Anrakkii Monkii)
Heavenz
Dog Race (犬、走る; Inu Hashiru)
Give It All (がんばっていきまっしょい; Ganbatte Ikimasshoi)
Tokyo Eyes
Fishes in August  (水の中の八月; Mizu no Naka no Hachigatsu)
License to Live (ニンゲン合格) (Ningen Gokaku)

1999
Falling Into the Evening (落下する夕方) (Rakka suru yugata)
Shikoku (死国; lit. "Death Country")
Avec mon mari (アベックモンマリ)
Ley Lines (日本黒社会; Nihon kuroshakai)
The Exam (お受験; O-juken)
新極道伝説　三匹の竜
Secret (秘密; Himitsu)
Charisma (カリスマ)
Dead or Alive (DOA Dead or Alive 犯罪者)
Audition (オーディション)

2000
Uzumaki/Spiral a.k.a. Vortex (うずまき)
Crazy Lips (発狂する唇)
Space Travelers (スペーストラベラーズ)
Monday
Persona (仮面学園; Kamen gakuen)
I Am an S+M Writer (不貞の季節; Futei no kisetsu
Sweet Sweet Ghost (スイート・スイート・ゴースト)
The City of Lost Souls (漂流街 The Hazard City)
By Player (三文役者)
Dead or Alive 2: Birds (Dead or Alive 2: 逃亡者)
PARTY7
鞠智城物語　防人たちの唄
Brother

2001
降霊 (Gourei)
Stereo Future
Rush! (2001)
Go
Rain of Light (光の雨)
化粧師 (Kewaishi)

2002
Long Love Letter: Hyouryu kyoushitsu
Kikuchijou monogatari - sakimori-tachi no uta
 Sabu さぶ
 旅の途中でFARDA
 Drive
 MPD-PSYCHO/FAKE
Utsutsu (うつつ)
Dolls
The Twilight Samurai (たそがれ清兵衛)
Last Scene
Doing Time　(刑務所の中)

2003
Thirteen Steps (13階段)
Getting Off the Boat at Her Island (船を降りたら彼女の島)
 Collage of Our Life
 Revolver - Green Spring (リボルバー －青い春－)
 Rockers
 Director Infection: "Kenenn" (監督感染　ＫＥＮＥＮＮ
 Iden&Tity (アイデン＆ティティ)

2004
Red Moon (赤い月)
Legendary Crocodile, Jake and His Fellows (伝説のワニ　ジェイク)
Zebraman (ゼブラーマン)
eiko (エイコ)
Village Photobook (村の写真集; mura no shashinshuu)
Lady Joker (レディ・ジョーカー)
Out of This World (この世の外へ クラブ進駐軍)

2005
Dead run (疾走; shisso)
Takeshis'
Life on the Longboard

2007
Nightmare Detective (悪夢探偵)
Exte (エクステ)
Glory to the Filmmaker! (監督·ばんざい!)

2008
Achilles and the Tortoise (アキレスと亀)
Nekonade

2010s
Postcard (2010) (Kichigoro)
Yuriko, Dasvidaniya (2011) (百合子、ダスヴィダーニヤ)
Crying 100 Times: Every Raindrop Falls (2013)
Garo: Makai no Hana (2014) (四道、Shidō)
Chasuke's Journey (2015)
Bitter Honey (Mitsu no Aware) (2016)
Shin Godzilla (2016)
Outrage Coda (2017) (アウトレイジ 最終章)
The Chaplain (2018)
Back Street Girls: Gokudols (2019)

Television
 Katte ni shiyagare! Eiyû-keikaku (1996) ... a.k.a. Suit Yourself or Shoot Yourself: The Hero (International: English title) .... Suzuki
 Shinsengumi Keppūroku (1998) .... Susumu Yamazaki
 Manatsu no Merry Christmas (2000) .... Akira Ohashi
 Kôrei (2000) ... a.k.a. Seance (International: English title)... a.k.a. Seance (Ko-Rei) (Canada: English title) .... Restaurant customer
 Furenzu (2000) ... a.k.a. Friends (Japan: English title) .... Kobayashi
 Tajuu jinkaku tantei saiko - Amamiya Kazuhiko no kikan (2000, mini series) ... a.k.a. MPD Psycho ... a.k.a. Multiple Personality Detective Psycho - Kazuhiko Amamiya Returns (Japan: English title) .... Tooru Sasayama
 Sayonara ozu sensei (2001)
 Paato-taimu tantei (2002)
 Sabu (2002) .... Heizo
 Paato-taimu tantei 2 (2004)
 Boku to kanojo to kanojo no ikiru michi (2004, mini series)  .... Yoshirou Koyanagi
 Proof of the Man (2004)
 Seibu Keisatsu Special (2004)
 Samurai Rebellion (2013)
 ''The Supporting Actors (2017) .... himself
 Uso no Sensou (2017) .... Mamoru Sanpei
 Final Fantasy XIV - Dad of Light (Netflix / 2017) .... Hirotaro Inaba
 Kinkyu Torishirabeshitsu SS1 (2014). SS2 (2017)....Nakata Zenjiro.
 The Supporting Actors 2 (2018) .... himself

References

External links

 

1951 births
2018 deaths
People from Tokushima Prefecture
Japanese male actors